Karl VII may refer to two European monarchs:

 Charles VII of Sweden, actually Charles I of Sweden (1161–1167)
 Charles VII, Holy Roman Emperor (1697–1745)